Imraz Raffi (born 19 September 1992) is a Sri Lankan-born cricketer who plays for the Qatar national cricket team. He made his first-class debut for Chilaw Marians Cricket Club in the 2011–12 Premier Trophy on 26 January 2012.

See also
 List of Chilaw Marians Cricket Club players

References

External links
 

1992 births
Living people
Sri Lankan cricketers
Qatari cricketers
Chilaw Marians Cricket Club cricketers
Moors Sports Club cricketers
Cricketers from Colombo
Sri Lankan emigrants to Qatar
Sri Lankan expatriate sportspeople in Qatar